Maurice Hommedieux was the member of the Parliament of England for Great Bedwyn for the parliament of December 1421.

References 

Members of Parliament for Great Bedwyn
English MPs December 1421
Year of birth unknown
Year of death unknown